Juanita High School is a high school in Kirkland, Washington, administered by Lake Washington School District. It was opened on September 4, 1971, as a result of a campaign driven by an education theory known as the "Juanita Concept", developed by John Strauss, who became the school's first principal. It was later discovered that this concept did not work, primarily because of the passing of the "Basic Education Law" in the mid-1970s, resulting in the school later remodeling into a traditional format. The mascot chosen was the "rebel", to represent the rebellious nature of the teaching concept.

New building 
In June 2018, half the school was demolished and rebuilt to house more students. The whole school has been rebuilt and fully refurbished as of September of 2020.

Mascot controversy 
During the 1980s, the school's logo was altered, utilizing features of the Confederate flag, and depicting the "Running Rebel" as a Confederate soldier. In 2017, a student started a petition to change the mascot, citing the mascot's controversial historical ties to the Confederacy as racist. The students voted at the time to keep the mascot.

In 2020, alumni and current students resurrected the petition, and the superintendent removed the Rebel mascot before the 2020-21 school year began. Students later voted for the new mascot to become the Raven.

Notable alumni
 Micah Downs, Current VTB United League player
Jill Kintner, Won a bronze medal in BMX cycling at the 2008 Summer Olympics.
Bryan Walters, Former NFL player (Jacksonville Jaguars)
Mike O’Hearn, American actor and Bodybuilder
Salvon Ahmed, NFL Running Back for the Miami Dolphins
Cher Scarlett, American software engineer and workers' rights activist

References

External links
 

Educational institutions established in 1971
High schools in King County, Washington
Schools in Kirkland, Washington
Public high schools in Washington (state)
1971 establishments in Washington (state)